The 2018–19 San Diego State men's basketball team represented San Diego State University during the 2018–19 NCAA Division I men's basketball season. The Aztecs, led by second-year head coach Brian Dutcher, played their home games at Viejas Arena as members in the Mountain West Conference. They finished the season 21–13, 11–7 in Mountain West play to finish in a tie for fourth place. They defeated UNLV and Nevada to advance to the championship game of the Mountain West tournament where they lost to Utah State.

Previous season
The Aztecs finished the season 22–11, 11–7 in Mountain West play to finish in a tie for fourth place. They defeated Fresno State, Nevada, and New Mexico to become champions of the Mountain West tournament. As a result, they received the Mountain West's automatic bid to the NCAA tournament. As the No. 11 seed in the West region, they lost to Houston in the first round.

Offseason

Departures

Incoming transfers

2018 recruiting class

Roster

Schedule and results

|-
!colspan=9 style=| Exhibition

|-
!colspan=9 style=| Non-conference regular season

|-
!colspan=9 style=| Mountain West regular season

|-
!colspan=9 style=| Mountain West tournament

References

San Diego State Aztecs men's basketball seasons
San Diego State
San Diego State
San Diego State